Melbourne International Biennial 1999 
"Signs of Life" 14 May - 27 June 1999

The Melbourne International Biennial was a cultural initiative of the City of Melbourne in partnership with Arts Victoria, Department of Premier and Cabinet and the Ian Potter Museum of Art, the University of Melbourne.

Curator: Juliana Engberg / Organisation: Bala Starr

Artists:

& the "Collaborating Countries Projects" included works in National Pavilions by the following artists:

 Austrian Pavilion: Anne Schneider, Elke Krystufek, Franz West (curator: Andraes Reiter Raabe)
 Belgian Pavilion: Dirk Braeckman, Jan Van Imschoot, Sven 't Jolle (curator: Jan Hoet)
 Canadian Pavilion: Geoffrey Farmer, Myfanwy Macleod, Ron Terada, (curator: Kitty Scott)
 Chinese Pavilion: Wang Jianwei, Li Yongbin (curator: Huang Du)
 Danish Pavilion: Henriette Heise, Jakob Jakobsen (curator: Dorthe Abildgaard & Marianne Krogh Jensen)
 French Pavilion: Valérie Jouve (co-ordinator:  by Jean-Pierre Dumont)
 Italian Pavilion: Paola di Bello, Mauricio Lupini, Roberto Marossi, Marcello Maloberti, Gabriele di Matteo, Alessandra Spranzi, Bert Theis, Enzo Umbaca (curators: Jen Budney & Roberto Pinto)
 Japanese Pavilion: Leiko Ikemura (curator: Itaru Hirano)
 Norwegian Pavilion: Knut Åsdam, UKS (curators: Bo Krister Wallström & Jørn Mortensen)
 Philippine Pavilion: Gerardo Tan (curator: Professor Patrick Flores)
 Swiss Pavilion: Sidney Stucki (curator: Pierre-André Lienhard)

Subjects

"..., I believe the Melbourne International Biennial - Signs of Life - exhibits a very human set of projects, as should be the case as we leave the twentieth century and begin to engage with the next millennial frontier." Juliana Engberg

References
Catalogue: "Signs of Life" Published by the City of Melbourne

External links
 http://www.artdes.monash.edu.au/non-cms/globe/issue10/dptxt.html
 http://www.physicsroom.org.nz/log/archive/8/melbourne/
 https://web.archive.org/web/20081202115637/http://www.frieze.com/issue/review/signs_of_life_melbourne_international_biennial/

Art biennials
Contemporary art exhibitions
Sculpture exhibitions
1999 in Australia
Australian contemporary art
1999 in art